The 2022–23 Anaheim Ducks season is the 30th season for the National Hockey League (NHL) franchise that was established on June 15, 1993.

The Ducks will attempt to improve on a disappointing 2021–22 campaign (a 31–37–14 record; 76 points) and return to the playoffs for the first time since 2018, when they were swept in the first round by the San Jose Sharks. This is also the first season without longtime captain Ryan Getzlaf as he retired at the end of the 2021–22 season. This is the first season the Ducks have entered without a captain.

This will be the first full season for the Ducks under general manager Pat Verbeek as former general manager Bob Murray was placed on administrative leave by the team pending the results of an ongoing investigation. On November 10, 2021, Jeff Solomon was named acting general manager but was then the interim general manager when Murray resigned. Then on February 3, 2022, the Ducks named Pat Verbeek the permanent general manager. The Ducks were eliminated from playoff contention on March 19, 2023, after a 2–1 loss to the Vancouver Canucks.

Standings

Divisional standings

Conference standings

Schedule and results

Preseason
The preseason schedule was published on June 30, 2022.

Regular season
The regular season schedule was released on July 6, 2022,

Roster

Transactions
The Ducks have been involved in the following transactions during the 2022–23 season.

Key:

 Contract is entry-level.
 Contract initially takes effect in the 2023-24 season.

Trades

Notes:
 Anaheim retains 50% of Kulikov's salary.
 Anaheim retains 50% of Klingberg's salary.

Players acquired

Players lost

Signings

Draft picks

Below are the Anaheim Ducks selections at the 2022 NHL Entry Draft, which was held on July 7 and 8, 2022, on ESPN,ESPN+, SN, and NHL Network at the Bell Centre in Montreal, Quebec.

References 

Anaheim Ducks seasons
Anaheim Ducks
Anaheim Ducks
Anaheim Ducks